The Six Chuter SR7 is an American powered parachute that was designed  and produced by Six Chuter of Yakima, Washington, introduced in 1997.

Design and development
The SR7's design goals included that it be capable of carrying large-sized pilots and passengers.

The aircraft was designed to comply with the US FAR 103 Ultralight Vehicles rules as a two-seat ultralight trainer or as an amateur built. It features a parachute-style high-wing, two-seats-in-tandem, tricycle landing gear and a single  Rotax 582 engine in pusher configuration.

The SR7 is built from a combination of aluminium and 4130 steel tubing. In flight steering is accomplished via foot pedals that actuate the canopy brakes, creating roll and yaw. On the ground the aircraft has lever-controlled nosewheel steering. The SR7 model was factory supplied in the form of an assembly kit that requires 40 hours to complete.

Variants
SR7
Base model with the  Rotax 582 engine.
SR7XL
Upgraded model with SR7 options included as standard.
Power Hawk
Similar to the SR7, but came fully assembled.
Discovery
Based on the SR7, but with a fiberglass enclosure. Provided fully assembled.

Specifications (XR7XL)

References

SR7
1990s United States ultralight aircraft
Single-engined pusher aircraft
Powered parachutes